Queen of the Elephants is a book written by the conservationist and travel writer Mark Shand and the corresponding BBC documentary Queen of the Elephants, based on the life of the first female mahout in recent times—Parbati Barua of Kaziranga. The book went on to win the Prix Litteraire d'Amis award, providing free publicity simultaneously to the profession of mahouts, and to Kaziranga.

References

Indian biographies
1990s novels
1996 novels
20th-century Indian books